Betty Bouton (September 10, 1891  - ?) was an American actress from Pennsylvania. She appeared in 16 films between 1919 and 1924, with her last film being the Samuel Goldwyn part-Technicolor production Cytherea (1924).

Early years
Bouton graduated from the University of Pennsylvania planning to be a social service worker, and she was a probation officer in several cities' juvenile courts. She also was an investigator for a charity organization and a social investigator for a psychological clinic. Acting attracted her attention, however, and she attended the Sargent School of Dramatic Art.

Career 
Bouton began acting professionally in stock theater, performing with Nat Goodwin in The Merchant of Venice and later with Bertha Kalich in The Riddle Woman. After those experiences on stage, she began acting in films, including Daddy Long Legs with Mary Pickford. Her early film work was all in ingenue roles.

Personal life
Bouton married scenario writer Arthur Jackson in 1920. He and their baby died before March 1924.

Partial filmography
Heart o' the Hills (1919)
Three Men and a Girl (1919)
Daddy-Long-Legs (1919)
The Final Close-Up (1919)
A Man's Fight (1919)
Victory (1919)
The Hell Ship (1920)
Don't Ever Marry (1920)
The Mollycoddle (1920)
No Trespassing (1922)
 You Can't Get Away with It (1923)
Enemies of Women (1923)
Not a Drum Was Heard (1924)
Cytherea (1924)

References

External links
 

1891 births
Year of death missing
Actresses from Pennsylvania
American film actresses
American silent film actresses
20th-century American actresses